The 2010-11 ABL Season was the second season for the Singapore Slingers in the Asean Basketball League Australia. The Slingers went into this season without their 2009-2010 season's local star Hong Wei Jian, who was out with a career-ending knee injury.

Off-season

Additions

Subtractions

Roster

Game log

2010-11 Singapore Slingers Season
3 October: Singapore Slingers vs. Satria Muda Britama; Singapore Indoor Stadium, Singapore(W, 94-93)
9 October: Singapore Slingers @ Philippines Patriots; Ynares Sports Arena, Philippines(L, 59-62)
17 October: Singapore Slingers vs. Westports KL Dragons; Singapore Indoor Stadium, Singapore (W, 74-61)
23 October: Singapore Slingers @ Westports KL Dragons; MABA Stadium, Malaysia (L, 74-81)
31 October: Singapore Slingers vs. Chang Thailand Slammers; Singapore Indoor Stadium, Singapore (W, 87-81)
6 November: Singapore Slingers @ Satria Muda BritAma; The BritAma Stadium, Indonesia (L, 83-88)
10 November: Singapore Slingers @ Brunei Barracudas; Brunei Indoor Stadium, Brunei Darussalam (W, 81-74)
14 November: Singapore Slingers vs. Philippines Patriots; Singapore Indoor Stadium, Singapore (L, 85-87)
23 November: Singapore Slingers vs.  Brunei Barracudas; Singapore Indoor Stadium, Singapore (W, 74-70)
4 December: Singapore Slingers @ Chang Thailand Slammers; Nimibutr National Stadium, Thailand (L, 66-77)
14 December: Singapore Slingers vs Satria Muda BritAma; Singapore Indoor Stadium, Singapore(L, 83-73)
18 December: Singapore Slingers @ Philippines Patriots; Ynares Sports Arena, Singapore(L, 73-80)
5 January: Singapore Slingers @ Westsports KL Dragons; MABA Stadium, Malaysia (W, 93-90)
9 January: Singapore Slingers vs  Brunei Barracudas; Singapore Indoor Stadium, Singapore (W, 102-61)
15 January: Singapore Slingers @. Chang Thailand Slammers; Nimibutr National Stadium, Thailand (L, 65-66)

The Slingers ended the season with a league fourth-best 7-8 win-loss record.

Playoff round
24 January: Singapore Slingers @. Chang Thailand Slammers; Nimibutr National Stadium, Thailand (L, 76-81)
1 February: Singapore Slingers vs Chang Thailand Slammers, Singapore Indoor Stadium, Singapore
6 February: Singapore Slingers @. Chang Thailand Slammers; Nimibutr National Stadium, Thailand

References

2010-11
2010–11 in Singaporean basketball
2010–11 ABL season